The Gardner–Webb Runnin' Bulldogs men's basketball team is the men's college basketball team that represents Gardner–Webb University in Boiling Springs, North Carolina, United States. The school's team competes in the Big South Conference. They made their first NCAA tournament in 2019 by winning their first Big South tournament.

Postseason

NCAA Division I Tournament results
The Runnin' Bulldogs have appeared in the NCAA Division I Tournament one time. They have a record of 0–1.  Their 2018–2019 season is the subject of a documentary titled The Dancin’ Bulldogs which was released on October 16, 2020.

NCAA Division II Tournament results
The Runnin' Bulldogs have appeared in the NCAA Division II Tournament one time. Their record is 0–1.

CBI results
The Runnin' Bulldogs have appeared in the College Basketball Invitational (CBI) one time. Their record is 0–1.

CIT results
The Runnin' Bulldogs have appeared in one CollegeInsider.com Postseason Tournament (CIT). Their record is 0–1.

Notable former players

David Efianayi (born 1995), basketball player in the Israeli Basketball Premier League

References

External links